Kirk Palmer (born 12 October 1986) is an Australian freestyle swimmer and an Australian Institute of Sport scholarship holder.

He was selected in the squad for the 4×200-metre freestyle relay for the 2008 Summer Olympics in Beijing.  He helped Australia qualify sixth in the heats, but was dropped from the finals quartet to make way for Grant Hackett and Patrick Murphy. Australia took the bronze medal for its third-place finish in the final.

He was also a member of the Australian 4×200-metre freestyle relay team that broke the short course world record on 31 August 2007.

See also 
 List of Olympic medalists in swimming (men)
 World record progression 4 × 200 metres freestyle relay

References 

1986 births
Living people
Olympic swimmers of Australia
Swimmers at the 2008 Summer Olympics
Olympic bronze medalists for Australia
World record setters in swimming
Olympic bronze medalists in swimming
Australian male freestyle swimmers
World Aquatics Championships medalists in swimming
Australian Institute of Sport swimmers
Medalists at the FINA World Swimming Championships (25 m)
Medalists at the 2008 Summer Olympics
People from the Central Coast (New South Wales)
Sportsmen from New South Wales
21st-century Australian people